Marou Amadou is a Nigerien politician and the Minister of Justice of Niger.

Soon after Mahamadou Issoufou took office as President of Niger, he appointed Marou Amadou to the government as Minister of Justice and Government Spokesman on 21 April 2011.

References

Nigerien politicians
Justice ministers
Ministers of council of Niger
People from Dosso Region
1972 births
Living people